SDRE may be:

 South Devon Railway Engineering
 Sunny Day Real Estate